Stasiphron is a genus of moths of the family Yponomeutidae.

Species
Stasiphron cryptomorpha - Meyrick, 1931 

Yponomeutidae